Bala Deza (also Romanized as Bālā Dezā) is a village in Kolijan Rostaq-e Sofla Rural District, in the Central District of Sari County, Mazandaran Province, Iran. At the 2006 census, its population was 5,998, in 1,560 families.

References 

Populated places in Sari County